The National Youth Science Forum (NYSF) is a summer school programme dedicated to year eleven students who are heading into year twelve and are thinking about a career in science, engineering and related disciplines to major scientific institutions and researchers. They are also given training in time management, interview skills and public speaking. In previous years it has been known as the National Science Summer School (NSSS).

The Forum is a residential program and takes place during January in Canberra and Brisbane. All activities are supervised by student staff and resident Rotary counsellors. The program is advertised to be extremely intensive with little time for outside activities except for meeting those people already in the program.

Some say the most important aspect coming from the NYSF is a network of friends, colleagues and support groups throughout Australia which will be of value to participants for the whole of their lives. Very select students from New Zealand, South Africa and United Kingdom are now also involved.

History
The NSSS was funded in 1983 by the Canberra Development Board with assistance from many Canberra and outside organisations including Rotary, The Australian National University (ANU), the Commonwealth Scientific and Industrial Research Organisation (CSIRO) and the Canberra College of Advanced Education (CCAE) (now the University of Canberra). The concept was developed through Mr Neville Whiffen, then Chairman of the Canberra Development Board, with the support of members of Rotary in District 968, Sydney, and was organised by the staff of the CCAE.

The first NSSS was held in January 1984 with 198 students selected from across Australia. Mainstays of the program were Mr Bob Mitchell (subsequently Assistant Vice-Chancellor of the University of Canberra), Mr Ian Frencham (formerly CCAE, now retired), Dr Rodney Jory (University of Canberra, the founding Director of the NYSF), Mr and Mrs Ken Shields (Rotary Club of St. Ives, Sydney), Mr and Mrs Ted Armstrong (Rotary, Canberra) and six Rotarian couples, "house parents", one couple from each State in Australia.

After this first success, the NSSS was incorporated on 5 June 1984, a Council set up and a Director appointed.

Over the next few years, many changes were made to improve the program. The 1985 NSSS introduced specialised activity groups and for the first time, the Director was assisted by seven students, all of whom had attended in the previous year, who were invited to return as staff members. For January 1987 the NSSS was split into two sessions of two weeks, each of 138 students, 10 student staff, two Rotarian couples, and the Director.

In 1990 CRA Limited advised that it would support the NSSS financially, providing $120,000, and the NSSS became "The CRA National Science Summer School". The numbers increased to 144 per session. The scope of each of the subject groupings was widened to provide for groups only in physics/engineering, chemistry, biology and geology.

The 1991 NSSS saw the introduction of graduate seminars where students were able to question former students of the NSSS, who have now graduated, on their career choices. Additionally in 1992, the NSSS saw all student staff brought to Canberra during the Easter break of 1991 and given additional training. Subsequently, a larger responsibility was placed on the shoulders of these people in the following January, further emphasising the student nature of the NSSS organisation. Job Interviews for all students were introduced in 1993, and formal University Seminars (reunions) were held in all mainland State capitals in the following March.

In January 1995 the NSSS changed its name to "NYSF," a name more accurately reflecting the meaning of the program, and in September of that same year, Mrs Sandra Meek joined the staff of the NSSS Inc. taking over the responsibility of maintaining the student database from Mrs Ada Meek who now was able to concentrate more on program matters.

January 1997 was the last CRA NYSF as CRA Limited and RTZ Plc were later in the year merged to form Rio Tinto and this was to be the future prefix. However, early in 1998, almost concurrently with the appointment of John Sandeman as Chairman of Council, Rio Tinto announced that January 1999 was to be its last year of full sponsorship (at $200,000) and that the sponsorship would be halved for January 2000 and drop to $25,000 thereafter. Rio Tinto very generously made $25,000 available to assist with a sponsorship search and provided two weekends of professional seminars in which Council members and past students were given advice into how to find sponsors. Council set an initial target of $400,000 for January 2001 and saw this as made up of 8 University sponsors and 8 industry sponsors each at $25,000 pa. The concept of university sponsors was only possible after the emphasis that had been placed on universities at both Orientation and University Seminars in the past few years.

The NYSF in January 2000 was, for the first time the "National Youth Science Forum" with no sponsor name. Partner universities and industry groups took part in both sessions and changed the emphasis from the mining industry base of past years to a university/industry base.

In November 2000, Mrs Ada Meek retired from the office after being with the NYSF for 17 years. The Council expressed its gratitude to Ada for the influence she had had on the organisation over those years. With a full-time replacement for Ada and the Director now full-time, the NSSS Inc. employed, from December 2000, 4 full-time staff and a part-time accountant.

Applications for the January 2001 NYSF remained the same as in previous years but the numbers of boys and girls at session A was essentially the same. In session B, however, there were 84 girls to 60 boys, the reason for the difference being a mystery. Six South Africans joined the six New Zealanders as students included in the subject groups. Two Canadians from the Canada Wide Science Fair were present during Session A.

In 2005, after years of dedication to the program, the Director, Prof. Rod Jory retired and was replaced by Geoff Burchfield. Geoff was previously the head of CSIRO’s Media Unit in Canberra.

The 2010 NYSF was an expansion of previous years, with a third session being held in Perth, overseen by the new Associate Director, Tom Grace.

After 8 years at the helm of the organisation, Geoff Burchfield stepped down as Director in 2013 to focus on program development for the NYSF. His successor is Damien Pearce.

During 2017 session, it was announced that a third session was to open for 2018. This is to be hosted at University of Queensland in Brisbane.

Application process
Applications are open to all Year 11 students who are permanent residents of Australia and are interested in proceeding to tertiary studies in Australia to do a science, engineering or technology course. Applications close 31 May each year for the following January forum. To become a participant of the NYSF, Rotary International select a number of pupils in which they will sponsor to go to the Forum, which includes an interview, impromptu speech, group and social activities, and depending on schools and rotary clubs, examinations.

See also
London International Youth Science Forum
Asian Science Camp
National Science Camp
Stockholm International Youth Science Seminar
Canada-Wide Science Fair

References

External links
Official NYSF Web site
NYSF promotional video
Rotary in Australia

Educational organisations based in Australia
Youth science
Youth in Australia
1984 establishments in Australia
Youth organizations established in 1984